Andrey Konstantinovich Nartov (1683—1756) was a Russian scientist, military engineer, inventor and sculptor. He was a personal craftsman of Peter I of Russia, and later a member of the Russian Academy of Science.

Career 
From 1705 Nartov worked in the lathe workshop at the Moscow School of Mathematics and Navigation in the Sukharev Tower, Moscow. During the period 1712-1725 Nartov worked in the newly founded Saint Petersburg, at the palace workshop of the  Tsar Peter the Great. There he constructed many lathes of different types and made a number of innovations. Of special value was his copying lathe for the purpose of ornamental turning, which allowed the user to make ornaments with the same precision as that of handicraft work of that time.

In 1718 Nartov invented what might have been the first lathe with a mechanical cutting tool-supporting carriage and a set of gears (also known as a compound rest or slide rest).

In 1718-1719 Nartov travelled to England and France and demonstrated his lathes. In his letters to Peter I, Nartov wrote that nowhere in Europe could he find lathe masters comparable to Russian ones. On his way back to Russia, he taught lathe-working to the Prussian King Friedrich Wilhelm I.

After the death of Peter I in 1725 Nartov went to work at the Moscow Mint, where he supervised modernisation of the machinery. In 1727 Nartov wrote a book about Peter the Great, containing many interesting historic details of the scenes that Nartov witnessed when he worked at the palace workshop together with the Tsar. That book became the source of many historical anecdotes about Peter the Great.

In 1735 Nartov was elected a member of the Russian Academy of Science, where he was one of the few Russians amongst many Germans and other foreigners. From 1736 to the end of his life Nartov was head of the Academy's lathe workshop.

Among other inventions of Nartov are such things as a unique fast-fire battery on a rotating disc, a screw mechanism for changing the artillery fire angle, a gauge-boring lathe for cannon-making and an early telescopic sight. He also supervised the building of a device intended to lift the gigantic Tsar Bell onto a bell-tower.

See also 
 List of Russian inventors

References

External links 
 Nartov Andrey Konstantinovich 
 Nartov's biography at hronos.km.ru 

Russian inventors
Russian military engineers
18th-century sculptors from the Russian Empire
Russian male sculptors
Russian cannon makers
1683 births
1756 deaths
18th-century engineers from the Russian Empire
18th-century scientists from the Russian Empire
Burials at Lazarevskoe Cemetery (Saint Petersburg)